Tadija (Serbian Cyrillic: Тадија) is a Serbian masculine given name (derived from the Greek name “Thaddaios”) that may refer to
Tadija Dragićević (born 1986), Serbian basketball player 
Tadija Kačar (born 1956), Serbian boxer 
Tadija Smičiklas (1843–1914), Croatian historian and politician 
Tadija Sondermajer (1892–1967), Serbian and Yugoslav Royal Air Force Reserve Colonel
Tadija Tadić (born 1999), Serbian basketball player

Serbian masculine given names